is a Japanese field hockey player. She competed with the Japan women's national field hockey team in the women's tournament at the 2012 Summer Olympics.

References

External links
 

Living people
1987 births
Field hockey players at the 2012 Summer Olympics
Field hockey players at the 2020 Summer Olympics
Olympic field hockey players of Japan
Japanese female field hockey players
Female field hockey goalkeepers
Asian Games medalists in field hockey
Field hockey players at the 2010 Asian Games
Sportspeople from Gifu Prefecture
Asian Games bronze medalists for Japan
Medalists at the 2010 Asian Games